The International Commission for Maritime History (ICMH) was established in 1960 to promote international cooperation and the exchange of ideas in the field of maritime history.  It is affiliated with the International Committee of Historical Sciences.

History 
Founded as the Commission Internationale d’Histoire Maritime, (or CIHM), it was first organized at Lisbon, Portugal, on 14 September 1960.  It is registered in Paris, France, as a non- profit “association étrangère selon le décret-loi du 12 avril 1939” and was authorised by the “Ministère de l’Intérieur” by “arrêté du 7 mai 1965” (See, Journal Officiel of 13 June 1965, p. 4936).

The International Commission for Maritime History is the successor organization to the International Commission for the History of Great Discoveries (ancienne Commission internationale pour l’histoire des grandes découvertes)

Membership 

Membership in the organisation is by national delegation. At present the following countries have national organizations as members:

 Australia   Australian Association for Maritime History
 Canada Canadian Nautical Research Society | CNRS website
 Denmark   The Committee for Danish Maritime History and Anthropology
 Finland
 France   Sociéte française d'histoire maritime
 Germany Deutsche Seefahrtsgeschichtliche Kommission
 Great Britain British Commission for Maritime History
 The Netherlands
 Norway
 USA North American Society for Oceanic History

The following organisations have ICMH associate membership
 International Maritime Economic History Association (IMEHA)
   Association of the History of the Northern Seas (AHNS)

Officials 
The Secretariat is currently located at the Old Dominion University in Norfolk, VA,  United States:

Prof. Dr. Ingo Heidbrink
-Secretary General- 
International Commission for Maritime History
c/o Department of History
Old Dominion University
8000 Batten Arts & Letters Building
Norfolk, VA 23529
USA

 President: Dr. Graydon Henning (Australia)
 Immediate past president: Dr. Atle Thowsen (Norway)
 Vice-presidents: Dr. Tapio Bergholm (Finland), Dr. William Glover (Canada), Prof. John Hattendorf (United States)
 Secretary General: Prof. Dr. Ingo Heidbrink (Germany / United States)
 Treasurer: Dr. Mary Ellen Condon-Rall (United States)

References

External links 
 

History organizations based in France
Organizations based in Paris
Non-profit organizations based in France
Maritime history organizations
Organizations established in 1960